Synanthedon uralensis is a moth of the family Sesiidae. It is found from Ukraine and southern Russia to Uralsk, Kazakhstan and Mongolia.

The wingspan is about 18 mm.

The larvae possibly feed on Artemisia species.

References

Moths described in 1906
Sesiidae